Alexander Fyodorovich Gorkin (Russian: Александр Фёдорович Горкин; September 5, 1897 – June 29, 1988) was a Soviet state and party leader, Secretary of the Presidium of the Supreme Soviet of the Soviet Union (1938–1953 and 1956–1957), Hero of Socialist Labour (1967).

Biography
Gorkin was born into a peasant family. In 1916, he joined the Bolsheviks. In 1917, he graduated from the Tver Gymnasium. From August 1917 to June 1919, Secretary of the Tver City Council of Deputies, from December 1918 to February 1919, Chairman of the Provincial Executive Committee. In 1919, a member of the Board of the Kursk Governatorial Extraordinary Commission, the head of the Penza Governatorial Village Department and out-of-school subdivision. In 1920–1921, at political work in the Red Army.

In 1921–1933, an employee of the Tver Governatorial Committee of the Russian Communist Party (Bolsheviks), the Kyrgyz Regional Committee of the Russian Communist Party (Bolsheviks), the Orenburg Governatorial Committee of the Russian Communist Party (Bolsheviks), the Agricultural Union, the Poultry and Water Union, the Middle Volga Regional Committee of the All-Union Communist Party (Bolsheviks), apparatus of the Central Committee of the All-Union Communist Party (Bolsheviks). In 1931–1932, he studied at the Agrarian Faculty of the Institute of Red Professors in Moscow. In 1933–1934, the Second Secretary of the Middle Volga Regional Committee of the All-Union Communist Party (Bolsheviks) in Samara.

From December 1934 to July 1937, he was the First Secretary of the newly created Orenburg Regional Committee of the All-Union Communist Party (Bolsheviks). During this period, mass repressions took place in the Orenburg Oblast, during which, in particular, all members of the Bureau of the Regional Committee of the All-Union Communist Party (Bolsheviks) were killed.

From July 9, 1937 to January 1938 – Secretary of the Central Executive Committee of the Soviet Union. In 1938–1953 and 1956–1957 – Secretary of the Presidium of the Supreme Soviet of the Soviet Union (from March 15, 1953 to July 15, 1956 this position was held by Nikolai Pegov, and Gorkin was deputy). Member of the Supreme Soviet of the Soviet Union of the 1–8th convocations (1937–1974).

In 1957–1972 – Chairman of the Supreme Court of the Soviet Union, simultaneously in 1959–1961 – Chairman of the Central Audit Commission of the Communist Party of the Soviet Union. He participated in a campaign for the rehabilitation of victims of personality cult.

He was a delegate to the 8–10, 15, 17–24 Congresses of the All-Union Communist Party (Bolsheviks) and the Communist Party of the Soviet Union. A Candidate Member of the Central Committee of the All-Union Communist Party (Bolsheviks) (1939–1952), a member of the Central Audit Commission of the Communist Party of the Soviet Union (1952–1976).

Since 1972 – a personal pensioner. He lived in Moscow. He was buried at the Novodevichy Cemetery.

Family
The son, Yuri Alexandrovich Gorkin (born in 1921), a participant in the Great Patriotic War, was awarded orders and medals. He graduated with honors from the Moscow Higher Technical School named after Nikolai Bauman with a degree in radio electronics. Director of the Research Institute of Biotechnology, Doctor of Technical Sciences, Professor. Wife, Gorkina Nadezhda Nikolaevna, artist-architect, restorer.

Daughter, Olga Yuryevna Gorkina, journalist, art critic, television producer.

Daughter, Maya Alexandrovna Gorkina (born in 1930) was married to an intelligence officer of the Main Intelligence Directorate, resident in Norway and the United Kingdom, Yevgeny Ivanov (1926–1994), involved in a scandal with a lover of the British Minister of War, John Profumo, a 19-year-old dancer and Model Christine Keeler.

Awards
Hero of Socialist Labour (September 4, 1967);
Three Orders of Lenin (September 4, 1947; September 4, 1957; September 4, 1967);
Order of the October Revolution (August 31, 1971);
Order of the Red Banner of Labour (September 2, 1977);
Order of Friendship of Peoples (September 3, 1982);
Order of the Badge of Honour (September 4, 1987);
Medals.

References

External links

Biography in the History Handbook of the Communist Party and the Soviet Union

1897 births
1988 deaths
People from Rameshkovsky District
Central Committee of the Communist Party of the Soviet Union candidate members
Heroes of Socialist Labour
Recipients of the Order of Friendship of Peoples
Recipients of the Order of Lenin
Recipients of the Order of the Red Banner of Labour
First convocation members of the Supreme Soviet of the Soviet Union
Second convocation members of the Supreme Soviet of the Soviet Union
Third convocation members of the Supreme Soviet of the Soviet Union
Fourth convocation members of the Supreme Soviet of the Soviet Union
Fifth convocation members of the Supreme Soviet of the Soviet Union
Sixth convocation members of the Supreme Soviet of the Soviet Union
Seventh convocation members of the Supreme Soviet of the Soviet Union
Eighth convocation members of the Supreme Soviet of the Soviet Union
Burials at Novodevichy Cemetery